Chapin is the given name of:

Chapin Hall (1816–1879), Republican US Representative from Pennsylvania
Chapin A. Harris (1806-1860), American physician and dentist
Chapin Rose (born 1973), Republican member of the Illinois Senate

See also
C. Chapin Cutler (1914–2002), American electrical engineer